Jeffrey Luck Lucas (born Donald Jeffrey Lucas; September 23, 1962, in Gary, Indiana) is an American musician. A singer-songwriter, composer, and arranger, he is also a former and founding member of the seminal 1980s garage band The Morlocks, as well as a formally trained composer and cellist.

Discography

Albums
 Just A Scream (Greenhaus Recording Co., 1985)
 Hell Then Divine (Antebellum, 2004)
 What We Whisper (Antebellum, 2006)
 The Lion's Jaw (Growler Recording Co., 2010)

Compilations

 "Cascade" on Comes with a Smile Vol. 10 (Comes with a Smile Magazine, 2004)
 "Agnes, Queen of Sorrow" on I Am A Cold Rock, I Am Dull Grass, a tribute to Will Oldham (Tract, 2005)
 "Whiteout" on Songs For Another Place (Awful Bliss, 2006)
 "Pale Silver Eyes" on Eye of the Beholder IV (Tract, 2007)

Other contributions

 Cello/arrangements on Steve Von Till's A Grave Is A Grim Horse
 Cello on Neurosis' The Eye of Every Storm
 Cello on Chuck Prophet's Age Of Miracles
 Cello on The Cult Inside My Head's (Pat Ryan of A Subtle Plague) Stalking Horse and Omnipowerless
 Cello on Paula Frazer's Now It's Time
 Cello/arrangements, bass, guitar, keys, backing vocals on Kira Lynn Cain's The Ideal Hunter
 Cello on Tom Heyman's Deliver Me
 Cello, backing vocals on Bob Frank and John Murry's Gunplay EP
 Cello on The Dirty Pictures' Shuttin' Out The World
 Cello on Rykarda Parasol's Our Hearts First Meet
 Cello on Highwater Rising's Summer Somewhere
 Cello on SF Seals' (Barbara Manning) Truth Walks in Sleepy Shadows
 Cello and backing vocals on Amee Chapman's Still Life

External links
 
 
 
 Jeffrey Luck Lucas' Official Site 
 [ Jeffrey Luck Lucas at Allmusic]

1962 births
American folk singers
American rock singers
American male pop singers
American classical cellists
American multi-instrumentalists
Songwriters from Indiana
Living people
American male songwriters